Austria's Strongest Man is an annual strongman contest consisting of exclusively Austrian strength athletes.
The event was established in 1989, the inaugural winner was Manfred Hoeberl who would go on to win the title a total of 7 times.

Event Placings

References

National strongmen competitions
Sport in Austria